Carnotena is a genus of moths of the Apatelodidae family. It contains the single species Carnotena xanthiata, which is found in Brazil (Ega).

References

 

Apatelodidae
Monotypic moth genera